Matthew Len Le Ber (born 1984) is an international lawn bowler from Guernsey.

Bowls career
He made his international debut in 2001 and represented Guernsey at four Commonwealth Games; in the singles at the 2006 Commonwealth Games & 2010 Commonwealth Games, in the singles and triples at the 2014 Commonwealth Games and the pairs at the 2018 Commonwealth Games.

He is a three times British champion winning the 2005 pairs, 2013 fours and 2016 triples at the British Isles Bowls Championships.

In 2007, he won the singles silver medal at the Atlantic Bowls Championships and in 2017 won gold and silver medals at the European Bowls Championships. Two years later in 2019, he won two gold medals at the same Championships.

Personal life
He is an accounts administrator by trade and his father is Len Le Ber (another bowls international).

References

Guernsey male bowls players
Living people
1984 births
Bowls players at the 2006 Commonwealth Games
Bowls players at the 2010 Commonwealth Games
Bowls players at the 2014 Commonwealth Games
Bowls players at the 2018 Commonwealth Games
Bowls European Champions